A laboratory bath could refer to any of the following:

Cooling bath: a laboratory device that lowers the temperature of the bath or improves heat conduction
Heated bath: a laboratory device that raises the temperature of the bath to enhance a chemical reaction
Laboratory water bath: a laboratory device that maintains the temperature of the bath
Oil bath: a laboratory device that uses oil an oil to regulate the temperature of a sample